Southborough may refer to:

Places
 Southborough, Bromley in London, England
 Southborough, Kent, a suburb of Tunbridge Wells, England
 Southborough, Kingston upon Thames in London, England
 Southborough, Massachusetts in the USA

Other uses
 Southborough (MBTA station) in Southborough, Mass., USA
 Southborough railway station (disambiguation), two former stations in south-east England
 Southborough High School, a boys' school in Surbiton, London
 Baron Southborough, a former title in UK peerage